Kamra is an Indian 
Khatri surname. People with the surname Kamra include:
Kunal Kamra (born 1988), Indian standup comedian

See also

Karra (name)
Kamara (surname)

Indian surnames
Punjabi-language surnames
Surnames of Indian origin
Hindu surnames
Khatri clans
Khatri surnames